Bashmaq (also Romanized as Bāshmāq) is a village in Kolah Boz-e Gharbi Rural District, in the Central District of Meyaneh County, East Azerbaijan Province, Iran. At the 2006 census, its population was 988, in 214 families.

References 

Populated places in Meyaneh County